Ondřej Horský (born 5 March 1977) is a Czech sprint canoer who has competed since the late 2000s. He won the bronze medal in the K-4 1000 m event at the 2010 ICF Canoe Sprint World Championships in Poznań.

References 
Canoe09.ca profile 

1977 births
Czech male canoeists
Living people
ICF Canoe Sprint World Championships medalists in kayak